Bolt Action Five were a dance-punk/industrial band from London, England, composed of Tobias J Hughes, Ian William Galloway, Dan "The Carnivore" Murtha and Mark Murphy. They formed in early 2006 from a variety of different members and appeared repeatedly in Artrocker and PlayMusic magazines, as well as in NME, i-D, Disorder Magazine and various online music journals.

The band seemed to have difficulty describing their sound, variously categorising themselves as indie rock, electro, industrial pop, dance-punk, or electro-metal. In interviews they listed Devo, Nine Inch Nails, Wire, Prince and Michael Jackson as influences.

The band split on 26 March 2008 and are working on new projects. Ian William Galloway, Tobias Hughes and Mark Murphy went on to form the band Fables, and Dan Murtha performs as Danimal Kingdom, and performs live with Kissy Sell Out.

Members
 Tobias J Hughes – guitar
 Dan "The Carnivore" Murtha – vocals, keyboards
 Ian William Galloway – bass, keyboards, samplers, drum machines
 Mark Murphy – keyboards, vocals, drum machines

Discography

Releases

Compilations 
"Spring Heeled Jack" – on Playmusic magazine compilation (October 2006)
"Gurl Howl" – on Artrocker magazine compilation (December 2006)
"Tree Friend Tree Foe" – on Japanese compilation (October 2007)
"Can The Freedom (Barringtone Remix)" – on Artrocker magazine compilation (December 2007)

See also
Dance-punk
Industrial music
New Cross

Sources 
 Artrocker, "The Friday Review," Issue 48, Page 22
 Artrocker, "Soundcheck," Issue 4, Page 10
 NME, "What's On The NME Stereo?," 30 March 2007
 Zoo, "10 New Tracks," 30 March 2007
 Profile - from The Guardian New Bands
 Review, Stealth, Nottingham - from FRINKmusic

Dance-punk musical groups
English rock music groups
British post-hardcore musical groups